is a Japanese film director, actress, and screenwriter best known for her work in the pink film genre.

Early life and education
Yoshiyuki studied economics at Dokkyo University.

Career
During her studies at Dokkyo University, Yoshiyuki developed a love of film. She debuted as an actress in the pink film genre in 1993 in director Toshiki Satō's . By the time of her directorial debut three years later, she had appeared in over 100 pink productions. Among the prominent pink film directors she has acted for is Satoru Kobayashi, the director of the first pink film, Flesh Market (1962). She appeared in Kobayashi's  (1995), starring AV idol, Nao Saejima. The mainstream Yokohama Film Festival awarded Yoshiyuki with the Best Supporting Actress title for her work in director Akio Jissoji's Rampo Edogawa adaptation, .

In 1996 Yoshiyuki directed her first pink film, . At the Pink Grand Prix she was given a Best New Director award for her debut work, as well as the second place for Best Actress. The film was selected as the 10th best pink release of the year. Since then, films directed by Yoshiyuki have often been placed in the top ten. Her talents as a screenwriter were also awarded at the 2004 Pink Grand Prix for the film .

Anglophone pink film authority Jasper Sharp contrasts Yoshiyuki's style with that of well-known female pink director Sachi Hamano. Calling her directorial style "softer and gentler" than Hamano's, which he characterizes as "lewder, ruder and cruder than most in the genre," he notes that it is easier to detect a feminine sensibility in Yoshiyuki's work. In her films she often depicts the lives of ordinary women in modern Japan. While this is not an unusual theme in the contemporary pink film, Yoshiyuki's work is recognisable for the meticulous and authentic detail the director achieves.

Yoshiyuki's directorial work has also been recognized by non-pink audiences. In 2004, her film  was invited to be shown at the Yūbari International Fantastic Film Festival. Her 2006 film, Big Tit Sisters: Blow Through the Valley, under the title , was also invited to be shown at the festival, and Yoshiyuki attended as a guest. Also honored by the pink film community, Big Tit Sisters was chosen as the 7th Best Film at the Pink Grand Prix ceremony, and the Walkerplus film site named it the sixth best pink film of the year. Her 2004 film , besides winning 5th best pink release at the Pink Grand Prix, was shown at the 13th Lesbian and Gay Film Festival.

Awards 
 1993: Pink Grand Prix Best New Actress
 1994 Pink Grand Prix: Best Actress, 4th place for 
 1995 Pink Grand Prix: Best Actress, 2nd place for (
 1996 Pink Grand Prix: Best Actress, 2nd place for Chronic Rutting Adultery Wife
 1996 Pink Grand Prix: Best New Director, 2nd place for Chronic Rutting Adultery Wife
 1997 Pink Grand Prix Best Director, for 
 2004 Pink Grand Prix, Best Screenplay for

Partial filmography

Top-ten films, Pink Grand Prix
 1996 10th place: 
 1998 5th place: 
 1999 4th place: 
 2004 5th place: 
 2004 7th place: 
 2005 5th place: 
 2005 6th place: 
 2006 7th place: 
 2007 2nd place: 
 2007 Honorable Mention:

Pinky Ribbon Award-winning films
 2004 Pearl Prize: 
 2005 Gold Prize: 
 2007 Silver Prize:

Bibliography

English

Dutch

Japanese

References

 
|-
! colspan="3" style="background: #DAA520;" | Pink Grand Prix
|-

1965 births
Japanese film actresses
Japanese film directors
Pink film directors
Pink film actors
Japanese female adult models
Japanese screenwriters
Living people
Japanese women film directors
Japanese women screenwriters
20th-century Japanese actresses
Dokkyo University alumni